Benigni is a surname. Notable people with the surname include:

Roberto Benigni (born 1952), Italian actor, comedian, screenwriter and director
Umberto Benigni (1862–1934), Italian Catholic priest and Church historian
Mark D. Benigni (born 1972), American politician; former mayor of Meriden, Connecticut

See also
21662 Benigni (1999 RC), a main-belt asteroid
Benign
Benigno (disambiguation)
Benignus (disambiguation)
Benini (surname)

Italian-language surnames